Norbury is a civil parish in Cheshire East, England.  It contains five buildings that are recorded in the National Heritage List for England as designated listed buildings, all of which are at Grade II.  This grade is the lowest of the three gradings given to listed buildings and is applied to "buildings of national importance and special interest".  Other than small settlements, the parish is rural, and most of the listed buildings are houses.  The Llangollen Canal runs through the parish, and one of its bridges is listed.

References

Citations

Sources

 

Listed buildings in the Borough of Cheshire East
Lists of listed buildings in Cheshire